A New York minute is a very short period of time.

New York Minute may also refer to:

 New York Minute (film), a 2004 American family comedy film starring Mary-Kate and Ashley Olsen
 "New York Minute" (Law & Order), a 2005 episode of the TV series
 "New York Minute" (song), by Don Henley, 1989, also covered several times
 In a New York Minute, a 1999 album by Ian Shaw
 "In a New York Minute" (song), by Ronnie McDowell, 1985

See also